Roy Chow Hin-yeung (born 8 October 1978) is a Hong Kong film director, producer and screenwriter. Best known for directed some films include Nightfall, Rise of the Legend and Dynasty Warriors, he often collaborated with screenwriter Christine To, who also as his wife. In 2013, with his film Nightfall, he won Best New Director category at the 32nd Hong Kong Film Awards; he previously nominated the same category for his film Murderer in 2010.

Filmography

References

External links 

1978 births
Living people
Hong Kong film directors
Hong Kong film producers
Hong Kong screenwriters